Revolutions is the ninth studio album by electronic musician and composer Jean-Michel Jarre, first released in August 1988. The album reached number 2 in the UK charts, Jarre's best chart position since Oxygène. The Destination Docklands concert in London coincided with the release of the album.

Composition and recording
The album was recorded and mixed at Croissy studio. The song "London Kid" was a collaboration with Shadows guitarist Hank Marvin. The title track contains reworked samples of an unpublished composition by Turk Kudsi Erguner, which Jarre had acquired from ethnologist Xavier Bellenger. Erguner took his case to court and won a modest indemnity. Jarre removed the flute part—the Ney—from new releases of the record and from live performances, the track was later retitled as "Revolution, Revolutions". The title track also featured vocoder by Jarre and Michel Geiss. The track "September" is dedicated to South African ANC activist Dulcie September, who was assassinated in Paris on 29 March 1988.

Track listing

1988 vinyl edition

1988 CD edition

1991 remaster

Personnel 
Personnel listed in album liner notes:
 Jean-Michel Jarre – Roland D-50, Korg DSS-1, Korg DSM-1, Fairlight CMI, Synthex, EMS Synthi AKS, OSC OSCar, EMS Vocoder, Dynacord Add-one, Cristal Baschet, Akai MPC60, drum programming, percussions
 Dominique Perrier – E-mu Emulator, Fairlight CMI, Ensoniq ESQ-1, Roland D-50, Elka Synthex, OSC Oscar, Akai MPC 60 programming
 Michel Geiss – ARP 2600, Kawai K5, Matrisequencer, Cavagnolo MIDY 20, Elka AMK 800.
Henri Loustau – sound engineer
Philippe Cusset – assistant
 Joe Hammer – Drums, Simmons, SDX, Dynacord Add-one
 Guy Delacroix – Bass guitar
 Sylvain Durand – Fairlight CMI on "London Kid"
 Hank Marvin – Guitar on "London Kid"
 Jun Miyake – Trumpet and Megaphone on "Tokyo Kid"
 Kudsi Erguner – Turkish flute
 Patrice Tison – Guitar 
 Mireille Pombo – Vocal chorus on "September"
 Francis Rimbert – Additional synthesizer programming
 The Bruno Rossignol Choir, directed by Bruno Rossignol – choir on "Industrial Revolution", "London Kid" and "The Emigrant"
 Female choir from Mali, directed by Sori Bamba – choir on "September"

Charts

Certifications

References 
Notes

Bibliography

External links 
 Revolutions at Discogs

1988 albums
Jean-Michel Jarre albums